Frol is a rural locality (a village) in Pertsevskoye Rural Settlement, Gryazovetsky District, Vologda Oblast, Russia. The population was 374 in 2002.

Geography 
Yezhovo is the nearest rural locality.

References 

Rural localities in Gryazovetsky District